The 1920 Oldenburg state election was held on 6 June 1920 to elect the 48 members of the Landtag of the Free State of Oldenburg.

Results

References 

Oldenburg
Elections in Lower Saxony